The British School New Delhi is an independent, multicultural, English Medium, co-educational international school. This not-for-profit school offers the National Curriculum of England adapted to an international context, the EYFS programme, the IGCSE and the IB Diploma Programme. With over 1,200 students from 66 nationalities, the school provides student-centred education in a safe, stimulating and multicultural environment.

The British School was awarded the Top British International School Award by BISA (British International School Awards) in London in January 2018. They also won the Outstanding Initiative to Support Student Safeguarding award at the same event. In addition, the school was recognised in Fortune India's Future 50 Schools Shaping Success.

History
The British School was started in July 1963 by a group of British parents with 40 students representing six nationalities in Defence Colony, New Delhi. They were supported by the British High Commissioner and in 1969 moved the school to a new location. While the school started with the aim of serving the diplomatic and expatriate community, its remit has broadened considerably over the years resulting in a definitive mix of British and international education in an Indian context. The school operates under the aegis of ‘The British School Society’ with the British High Commissioner to India as its President.

Curriculum
The British School is divided into Primary and Secondary sections, and further into Key Stages as follows:

Accreditation 
The school is an accredited member of the Council of International Schools (CIS) and of the International Baccalaureate Organisation (IBO), and is affiliated to London's Edexcel Examination Board and the Cambridge International Examinations Board.

The school is also a member of the Round Square Conference of Schools, Federation of British International Schools in Asia (FOBISIA), The Association of International Schools in India (TAISI), The Specialist Schools and Academies Trust (SSAT), The Headmasters' and Headmistresses' Conference (HMC), College Board, Universities and Colleges Admissions Service (UCAS), Common Sense Digital Citizenship, Academy for Internal School Head (AISH), East Asia Regional Council of School (EARCOS), and The Education Collaborative for International School (ECIS).

References

External links 

 

British international schools in India
Cambridge schools in India
Educational institutions established in 1963
High schools and secondary schools in Delhi
Private schools in Delhi
International schools in Delhi
1963 establishments in Delhi